Jan Christoffel 'Christo' Steyn (born 1 May 1961) is a former South African tennis player. Steyn won two Grand Prix doubles titles during his professional career.

A right-hander, Steyn reached his highest singles ATP ranking on 18 August 1986, when he became the No. 42 in the world, though he never won a Grand Prix or WCT tournaments singles title in his career.

Career finals

Doubles (2 titles)

References

External links
 
 

Living people
1961 births
South African male tennis players
People from Springs, Gauteng
White South African people
Sportspeople from Gauteng